"Highway Tune" is a song by American rock band Greta Van Fleet. It was their first single from their debut EP Black Smoke Rising. It topped the Billboard Mainstream Rock and Active Rock charts in September 2017. The song, and the rest of its respective EP, is also part of the band's double EP From the Fires, released on November 10, 2017.

Background
"Highway Tune" was the first song the band Greta Van Fleet had ever written and recorded together. The song's initial guitar riff was cited by guitarist Jake Kiszka as being written as early back as 2010—seven years prior to the song's release as a single, and two years prior to the band even being formed. The riff was then brought to early writing and recording sessions upon the band forming in 2012, and was later reformatted and demoed twice before being recorded in its final form. The song was initially used in an episode of the television show Shameless in January 2016. The song was officially released as one of four songs for the band's debut EP, Black Smoke Rising. The song was released on March 31, 2017 as a single, and on the EP on April 21, 2017. The song's music video was released 2 days prior to the EP's release, and is mostly a performance-based video, with the band playing in an abandoned warehouse.

Themes and composition
The song has received many comparisons to the work of Led Zeppelin, including comparison to the vocals of Robert Plant.

Reception
The song topped the Billboard Mainstream Rock and Active Rock stations in September 2017. The Mainstream Rock chart was topped in just 14 weeks. Billboard magazine noted that, outside of solo musicians breaking away from their original band, Greta Van Fleet with "Highway Tune" was the fastest for a band to top the Mainstream Rock charts with their debut single since Tantric's 2001 single "Breakdown" and 3 Doors Down's 2000 single "Kryptonite". Loudwire named it the second best hard rock song of 2017.

Personnel
Joshua Kiszka – lead vocals
Jacob Kiszka – guitar
Samuel Kiszka – bass guitar, keyboards
Daniel Wagner – drums

Charts

Weekly charts

Year-end charts

Certifications

References

Greta Van Fleet songs
2017 debut singles
Republic Records singles
2017 songs